Meliscaeva auricollis is a West Palearctic species of hoverfly.

Description
External images
For terms see Morphology of Diptera Wing length 6-9·5 mm. Elongated body. Lunula yellow with a black mark above it. Facial knob or more black; wing. Alula triangular. Tergite 2 usually with small elongate yellow marks, or small triangular marks. Tergites 3 and 4 with a pair of spots or narrowly connected bands. Elongated body. The male terminalia are figured by Hippa (1968). Larva described and figured by Rotheray (1994). 
See references for determination.

Distribution
Palearctic Fennoscandia South to Iberia, the Mediterranean basin. Ireland East through Europe into European parts of Russia and Turkey.

Biology
Habitat: Deciduous, broad-leaved evergreen and coniferous forest. Flowers visited include white umbellifers, Arbutus unedo, Chaerophyllum, Euonymus, Euphorbia, Filipendula, Hedera, Rubus, Salix, Sorbus, Viburnum opulus.
The flight period is  March to October (earlier and longer in southern Europe). The larva feeds on aphids or pysillids on trees.

References

Diptera of Europe
Syrphinae
Syrphini
Insects described in 1822
Articles containing video clips